Towell is a surname. Notable people with the surname include:

 C. Towell (MCC cricketer) (active in late 18th century)
 David Towell (1937–2003), Nevada politician
 Larry Towell (born 1953), photographer
 Richie Towell (born 1991), Irish footballer

See also
 Towel, material for drying